Vijay Kumar Malhotra (born 3 December 1931) is an Indian politician and a sport administrator. He belongs to the Bharatiya Janata Party.

He was born in the Lahore city of Punjab in British India which is now in Pakistan.  He was the 4th out of the seven children of Kaviraj Khazan Chand. He represented Delhi Sadar and South Delhi constituencies in the National Capital Territory of Delhi in the 9th Lok Sabha and the 14th Lok Sabha respectively.

Career

Malhotra has had long active career in politics; Chief Executive Councillor of Delhi's Metropolitan Council (Chief Minister equivalent, 1967), President of the Janata Party, Delhi (1977) and BJP, Delhi (1980–84). Along with Mr Kidar Nath Sahani and Madan Lal Khurana, Malhotra was credited with keeping BJP afloat in Delhi for many years.

His biggest political victory was defeating the former Prime Minister of India Manmohan Singh in the 1999 Indian general election by a huge margin. Malhotra has been a 5 time MP and 2 time MLA from Delhi, over the past 45 years, making him one of BJP's senior most figures in the capital.

In the 2004 Indian general election, Malhotra was the only BJP candidate to win his seat in Delhi, with the Congress winning the other 6 seats. Malhotra has enjoyed a spotless and clean image throughout his distinguished career, and even at the age of 82, despite not being offered a post by the Narendra Modi government, he offered to become BJP's election campaign chairman for Delhi and led the party to a whitewash victory, securing all 7 seats.
 
Malhotra is also an educationist. He holds a Doctorate in Hindi Literature. Besides politics and social work, Malhotra is also involved with the administration of the chess and archery clubs in Delhi.

Sports Administration 

Malhotra was the Senior Vice-President of the Indian Olympic Association and the acting President of the IOA since 26 April 2011, after Suresh Kalmadi was arrested by the CBI in connection with the alleged irregularities in awarding contracts for the 2010 Commonwealth Games.

He is also the president of the General Association of National Sports Federations and the president of the Archery Association of India since last 44 years. He was also associated with the organisation of the 2010 Commonwealth Games held in New Delhi.

In October 2015, Malhotra was named as the Chairman of the All Indian Council of Sports (AICS), and was given the rank of a minister of state.

Chief ministerial candidate 

On 26 September 2008 the BJP announced that Malhotra would be party's chief ministerial candidate in the election to Delhi Assembly in 2008. 

While Malhotra easily won his Greater Kailash constituency, the BJP failed to dislodge the Sheila Dikshit government. Only days after election results were revealed, Malhotra was in attendance in the Lok Sabha, fuelling speculation that he intends to continue in Parliament, instead of serving in the Delhi Legislative Assembly.  However he resigned as Member of Parliament and retained his seat of an MLA in Delhi and would serve as Leader of opposition.

References

1931 births
Living people
Politicians from Lahore
Bharatiya Janata Party politicians from Delhi
Delhi MLAs 2008–2013
India MPs 1977–1979
India MPs 1989–1991
India MPs 1999–2004
India MPs 2004–2009
Lok Sabha members from Delhi
Janata Party politicians
Bharatiya Jana Sangh politicians
Leaders of the Opposition in the Delhi Legislative Assembly
Indians imprisoned during the Emergency (India)
Indian sports executives and administrators
Rajya Sabha members from Delhi